The Communauté de communes Marche et Combraille en Aquitaine is a communauté de communes, an intercommunal structure, in the Creuse department, in the Nouvelle-Aquitaine region, central France. It was created in January 2017 by the merger of the former communautés de communes Chénérailles, Auzances-Bellegarde and Haut Pays Marchois. Its area is 964.8 km2, and its population was 13,476 in 2018. Its seat is in Auzances.

Communes
The communauté de communes consists of the following 50 communes:

Arfeuille-Châtain
Auzances
Basville
Bellegarde-en-Marche
Bosroger
Brousse
Bussière-Nouvelle
Champagnat
Chard
Charron
Châtelard
Le Chauchet
La Chaussade
Chénérailles
Le Compas
Crocq
Dontreix
Flayat
Fontanières
Issoudun-Létrieix
Lavaveix-les-Mines
Lioux-les-Monges
Lupersat
Mainsat
Les Mars
Mautes
La Mazière-aux-Bons-Hommes
Mérinchal
Peyrat-la-Nonière
Pontcharraud
Puy-Malsignat
Reterre
Rougnat
Saint-Agnant-près-Crocq
Saint-Bard
Saint-Chabrais
Saint-Dizier-la-Tour
Saint-Domet
Saint-Georges-Nigremont
Saint-Maurice-près-Crocq
Saint-Médard-la-Rochette
Saint-Oradoux-près-Crocq
Saint-Pardoux-d'Arnet
Saint-Pardoux-les-Cards
Saint-Priest
Saint-Silvain-Bellegarde
Sannat
Sermur
La Serre-Bussière-Vieille
La Villeneuve

References

Marche et Combraille en Aquitaine
Marche et Combraille en Aquitaine